Corbeil is a surname. Notable people with the surname include:

Carole Corbeil (1952–2000), Canadian arts critic and novelist
Chris Corbeil (born 1988), Canadian lacrosse player
Jean Corbeil (1934–2002), Canadian politician
Jean-Claude Corbeil (born 1932), Canadian linguist and lexicographer 
Jean Jacques Corbeil, French Canadian missionary
Josée Corbeil (born 1973), Canadian volleyball player
Normand Corbeil (1956–2013), Canadian composer
Pierre Corbeil (born 1955), Canadian politician and dentist
Yves Corbeil (born 1944), Canadian actor and television host

See also
Charlotte Corbeil-Coleman, Canadian actor and playwright
Mathieu Corbeil-Thériault (born 1991), Canadian ice hockey player